Brian van Goethem (born 16 April 1991) is a Dutch former professional racing cyclist, who rode professionally between 2013 and 2020, for the ,  and  teams. In August 2019, he was named in the startlist for the 2019 Vuelta a España.

Major results

2013
 1st Zuid Oost Drenthe Classic II
 3rd De Kustpijl
 6th Zuid Oost Drenthe Classic I
2014
 1st Stage 1 (TTT) Czech Cycling Tour
 3rd Ster van Zwolle
 4th Overall Tour de Gironde
 5th Duo Normand (with Peter Koning)
 8th Ronde van Drenthe
 9th Overall Olympia's Tour
2016
 6th Schaal Sels
2017
 3rd Omloop van het Houtland
 9th Arnhem–Veenendaal Classic

Grand Tour general classification results timeline

References

External links

1991 births
Living people
Dutch male cyclists
People from Terneuzen
Cyclists from Zeeland